Jim Ploeger (born 21 June 1991) is a Dutch professional baseball pitcher for L&D Amsterdam in the Dutch Major Leagues.

Ploeger attended the University of Arkansas at Pine Bluff, and pitched for the Arkansas–Pine Bluff Golden Lions. In 2013, he briefly played collegiate summer baseball with the Falmouth Commodores of the Cape Cod Baseball League. He was named to the Netherlands national baseball team roster for the 2017 World Baseball Classic.

References

External links

Living people
1991 births
2016 European Baseball Championship players
2017 World Baseball Classic players
Almere Magpies players
Arkansas–Pine Bluff Golden Lions baseball players
Falmouth Commodores players
Baseball pitchers
Dutch baseball players
HCAW players
L&D Amsterdam Pirates players
Minor league baseball players
UVV players
Dutch expatriate baseball players in the United States